Advanced technology refers, in general, to high technology.

Advanced technology may also refer to:

 Advanced steam technology
 Advanced Technology & Education Park
 Advanced Technology College
 Advanced Technology Development Center
 Advanced Technology Development Facility
 Advanced Technology Large-Aperture Space Telescope
 Advanced Technology Program

Technology and engineering disambiguation pages